The following are the football (soccer) events of the year 1917 throughout the world.

Events
Due to the First World War several leagues remain suspended throughout Europe.

Full date unknown:
 C.D. Palhavã, a Portuguese football club from, Palhavã is founded.

Winners club national championship
Argentina: Racing Club
Austria: Rapid Vienna
Belgium: no national championship
Denmark: KB
England: no national championship
France: no national championship
Germany: no national championship
Hungary: MTK Hungária FC
Iceland: Fram
Italy: no national championship
Luxembourg: US Hollerich
Netherlands: Go Ahead
Paraguay: Club Libertad
Scotland:
Division One: Celtic F.C.
Scottish Cup: No competition
Sweden: Djurgårdens IF
Uruguay: Nacional
Greece: 1913 to 1921 - no championship titles due to the First World War and the Greco-Turkish War of 1919-1922.

International tournaments
1917 Far Eastern Championship Games (May 9–11, 1917)
 China

 South American Championship 1917 in Uruguay (September 30, 1917 – October 14, 1917)

Births
 September 20 – Obdulio Varela, Uruguayan international footballer (died 1996)
 October 12 – Roque Máspoli, Uruguayan international footballer (died 2004)
 December 12 – Fred Stansfield, Welsh international footballer (died 2014)

Deaths 
 August 10 - Jimmy Speirs, Scottish footballer and scorer of 1911 FA Cup Final winning goal

References 

 
Association football by year